Pina is a 2011 German 3D documentary film about German dancer and choreographer   Pina Bausch. It was directed by Wim Wenders. The film premiered out of competition at the 61st Berlin International Film Festival.

During the preparation of the documentary, Pina Bausch died unexpectedly. Wenders cancelled the film production, but the other dancers of Tanztheater Wuppertal convinced him to make the film anyway. It showcases these dancers, who talk about Pina and perform some of her best-known pieces inside the Tanztheater Wuppertal and in various outdoor locations around the city of Wuppertal.

Synopsis
The film presents extracts from some of the most noted dance pieces by Pina Bausch in the Tanztheater ("dance theater") style of which Bausch was a leading exponent. The extracts are from four pieces:  Le sacre du printemps (The Rite of Spring), Café Müller, Kontakthof, and Vollmond. These are complemented with interviews and further dance choreographies, which were shot in and around Wuppertal, Germany; the film includes scenes showing the Wuppertal Schwebebahn, an elevated railway, and some dance sequences take place inside its carriages.

In the first piece, Le sacre du printemps (Frühlingsopfer, The Rite of Spring) (1975), the dancers of the Tanztheater Wuppertal, separated into male and female groups, move about a stage covered by a thick layer of peat.

The following section, Café Müller (1978), portrays a café Pina often visited when she was a child. In a simple setting consisting of some tables and chairs and doors, a small woman dressed in white is entering the café. Two more women, one of whom is obviously blind, appear. They hesitate to step further, as the tables and chairs are obstructing their way. Two men come around and try to remove these barriers. Eventually the blind woman and one of the men stand face to face. The second woman wraps her arms around the other men, but she slips. This part repeats and seems to remain in a loop.

The next piece, Kontakthof (Kontakt "contact" + Hof "court, courtyard", hence "contact court, courtyard of contact"), was performed multiple times for Wenders' cameras, with groups of different generations: teenagers, middle-aged dancers, and dancers over 65. Bausch had choreographed these three variants as Kontakthof – Mit Teenagern ab 14 (2008), Kontakthof (1978), and Kontakthof – Mit Damen und Herren ab 65 (2000). The film edits these performances into one, cutting between different performers to highlight their different abilities.

In the final piece, Vollmond (2006) (Vollmond, "full moon"), the stage is flooded. The scenery consists of one large rock and some chairs. At the end of the film, the actors face the audience on a small path with a brown coal mining region in the background to an open end.

Reception

Critical response
Reviews of the film were overwhelmingly positive. On Rotten Tomatoes it has an approval rating of 95%, based on 104 reviews, and an average rating of 8.28/10. The site's critical consensus called it "Pina is an immersive, gorgeously shot tribute to the people who express life through movement." It also has a score of 83 out of 100 on Metacritic, based on 32 critics, indicating "universal acclaim".

Roger Ebert gave the film three-and-a-half out of four stars. A. O. Scott of The New York Times was enthusiastic, saying "Choreography is a notoriously perishable art. Dances often struggle to outlive their creators. And Pina is, above all, an act of preservation, a memorial that is also a defiance of mortality — completely alive in every dimension." Kimberley Jones of the Austin Chronicle praised the "utterly transfixing, exhilarating spectacle of bodies in motion."

Accolades
Pina was selected as the German entry for the Best Foreign Language Film at the 84th Academy Awards and was submitted for Best Documentary Feature. On 18 November 2011, the film was named as one of the 15 shortlisted entries for Best Documentary Feature. On 18 January 2012, the film was also named as one of the nine shortlisted entries for Best Foreign Language Film. On 24 January 2012 it was finally nominated for an Academy Award for Best Documentary Feature, but failed to be nominated in the Best Foreign Language Film category. Had the film received Oscar nominations in both fields, it would have been the first film ever to do so.

The film was also nominated for Best Documentary Screenplay from the Writers Guild of America.

Home media
Pina was released on DVD and Blu-ray by the Criterion Collection in 2013.

See also
 List of submissions to the 84th Academy Awards for Best Foreign Language Film
 List of German submissions for the Academy Award for Best Foreign Language Film

References

External links
 
 
 
 Pina: Dancing for Dance an essay by Siri Hustvedt at the Criterion Collection

2011 films
2011 3D films
2011 documentary films
2010s musical films
Documentary films about modern dance
Films directed by Wim Wenders
Films shot in Nordrhein-Westfalen
German 3D films
Culture in Wuppertal
Dance in Germany
HanWay Films films
Recorded Picture Company films
European Film Awards winners (films)
2010s German-language films
3D documentary films